Clarks Point Airport  is a state-owned public-use airport located in Clarks Point, a city in the Dillingham Census Area of the U.S. state of Alaska.

As per Federal Aviation Administration records, the airport had 497 passenger boardings (enplanements) in calendar year 2008, an increase of 15% from the 432 enplanements in 2007. This airport is included in the FAA's National Plan of Integrated Airport Systems for 2009–2013, which categorized it as a general aviation facility.

Facilities and aircraft 
It has one runway designated 18/36 with a gravel surface measuring 3,200 by 60 feet (975 x 18 m). For the 12-month period ending December 31, 2008, the airport had 6,000 aircraft operations, an average of 16 per day: 67% air taxi and 33% general aviation.

Airlines and destinations

Statistics

References

External links 
 Resources for this airport:
 
 
 

Airports in the Dillingham Census Area, Alaska